Zhang Shaoling (born 4 November 1984) is a Macanese female weightlifter. She represents Macau at international competitions. 

She is the first weightlifter from Macau to win a medal at the World Weightlifting Championships.

Career 
Zhang competed at the 2009 Asian Weightlifting Championships in the women's 69 kg category. She placed first and won the gold medal. She also participated in the 2009 World Weightlifting Championships in the women's 69 kg category, winning a bronze medal and the first medal for Macau ever. She also participated at the 2009 East Asian Games winning at the same category.

Major Results

References

External links 

 Zhang Shaoling of Macau competes in the women's 69kg Group A weightlifting  REUTERS/Lee Jae-Won 
 HONG KONG, Dec 10, 2009 Zhang Shaoling (C) of China s Macao, Liu Chunhong (L) of China
 Zhang Shaoling of Macao attempts a lift during the women's 69kg... News Photo - Getty Images

1984 births
Living people
Macau female weightlifters